Vukovski Vrh is a dispersed settlement in the Municipality of Pesnica  in northeastern Slovenia. It lies along a ridge east of Jareninski Dol in the Slovene Hills. The area is part of the traditional region of Styria and is now included in the Drava Statistical Region.

References

External links
Vukovski Vrh on Geopedia

Populated places in the Municipality of Pesnica